363rd or 363d may refer to:

363d Expeditionary Operations Group, inactive United States Air Force unit
363d Bombardment Squadron or 19th Antisubmarine Squadron, inactive United States Air Force unit
363d Fighter Squadron or 164th Airlift Squadron, unit of the Ohio Air National Guard 179th Airlift Wing located at Mansfield Lahm Air National Guard Base, Ohio
363d Intelligence, Surveillance and Reconnaissance Wing 361st Intelligence, Surveillance and Reconnaissance Group
363rd Volksgrenadier Division (Wehrmacht), a volksgrenadier division of the Heer (German Army) during the Second World War

See also
363 (number)
363, the year 363 (CCCLXIII) of the Julian calendar
363 BC